The Riviera Maya Jazz Festival is an annual music festival hosted in Playa del Carmen, Mexico that was launched in 2003.

Lineup
Some of the artists who have performed through the years are:

Benny Ibarra, Tower of Power, Marcus Miller, Los Dorados, George Benson, Pepe Mor�n, H�ctor Infanz�n, Beaujean Project, Iraida Noriega, Earl Klugh, David Sanborn, Luca Littera, Sacb�, Billy Cobham, Fourplay, Gino Vannelli, Colin Hunter, Na�rimbo, Juan Alzate, Mark AAnderud, Enrique Neri, Jim Beard, Sergio Mendes, Spyro Gyra, Pat Martino, Herbie Hancock, Al Jarreau, Hiram G�mez, Mike Stern, Dave Weckl, Ivan Lins, Luis Conte, Eldar Djangirov, Al Di Meola, Incognito, George Duke, John McLaughlin, The Manhattan Transfer, Yekina Pav�n, Eugenia Le�n, Armando Manzanero, Natalia Lafourcade, Jeff Lorber, Randy Brecker, Jon Anderson, Stanley Clarke, Alex Otaola, Richard Bona, Yellowjackets, Joe D�Etienne, Pete Escovedo, Victor Wooten, Nortec, Poncho Sanchez, Level 42, Wayne Shorter, John Scofield, Frank Gambale, Brent Fisher, Scott Henderson, Jeff Berlin, Dennis Chambers, Ed Motta, Celso Pi�a, Matthew Garrison, Earth, Wind & Fire

Gallery

See also
 List of jazz festivals in North America

References

External links

 Official website
 Riviera Maya Jazz Festival on Facebook
 Riviera Maya Jazz Festival on Twitter

Festivals in Playa del Carmen
Jazz festivals in Mexico
Solidaridad (municipality)
Tourist attractions in Quintana Roo
Music festivals established in 2003
Autumn events in Mexico